Chuck Ruff may refer to: 

Charles Ruff (1939–2000), American attorney
Chuck Ruff (musician) (1951–2011), American rock drummer